Geum is a genus of about 50 species of perennial herbaceous plants in the rose family, Rosaceae, subfamily Rosoideae.

Species

A

B

C

D

E

F

G

H

I

J

L

M

O

P

Q

R

S

T

U

V

References
The following abbreviations are used to represent the authors cited in the above species list:

 eFloras - eFloras.org
 CatalogofLife - Catalogue of Life: 2011 Annual Checklist
 IOPI PGPC - International Organization for Plant Information (IOPI) Provisional Global Plant Checklist
 IPNI - The International Plant Names Index (IPNI)
 Plant List - The Plant List (Royal Botanic Gardens, Kew, and Missouri Botanical Garden)
 Tropicos - Tropicos.org. Missouri Botanical Garden
 USDA GRIN - USDA Germplasm Resources Information Network (GRIN)
 USDA Plants - USDA - Natural Resources Conservation Service (NRCS) PLANTS Database
 Wisplants - Robert W. Freckmann Herbarium, University of Wisconsin - Stevens Point

General References

 IOPI PGPC: Details for: Geum
 IPNI: Plant Name Query: Full search: Genus = Geum
 Plant List: Search results for Geum
 Tropicos: Search results for name=Geum
 Tropicos: Taxonomy Browser for genus Geum
 USDA GRIN: Species Records of Geum
 USDA GRIN: ISTA List of Stabilized Plant Names
 USDA Plants: Name Search Results for Geum
 Wikimedia Commons: Geum gallery page
 Wikispecies: Geum page
 Wisplants: Search Results: Genus: Geum

Specific References

Geum